Encantadia is a 2005 Philippine television drama fantasy series broadcast by GMA Network. The series is the first installment of the Encantadia franchise. Directed by Mark A. Reyes, it stars Sunshine Dizon, Iza Calzado, Karylle, Diana Zubiri, Dingdong Dantes and Jennylyn Mercado. It premiered on May 2, 2005 on the network's Telebabad line up. The series concluded on December 9, 2005 with a total of 160 episodes. It was replaced by Etheria: Ang Ikalimang Kaharian ng Encantadia in its timeslot.

The series is streaming online on YouTube.

Premise
In the land of Encantadia, the Sang'gre sisters Alena, Danaya, Amihan and Pirena are designated guardians of four kingdoms within Encantadia. Trusted by the four gems that will keel the peace in the entire land. The ambition of Pirena will destroy this peace. It is one against three, it is sister against sisters.

Cast and characters

Lead cast
Dingdong Dantes as Ybarro / Ybrahim
Sunshine Dizon as Pirena
Iza Calzado as Amihan
Karylle as Alena
Diana Zubiri as Danaya 
Jennylyn Mercado as Lira / Milagros

Supporting cast
Mark Herras as Anthony
Yasmien Kurdi as Mira
John Regala as Apitong
Pinky Amador as Carmen
Polo Ravales as Hitano
Nancy Castiglione as Muyak
Marky Lopez as Wantuk
Alfred Vargas as Aquil
Pen Medina as Hagorn 
Leila Kuzma as Agane
Girlie Sevilla as Gurna
Michael Roy Jornales as Apek
Gayle Valencia as Dina
Denise Laurel as Marge
Ehra Madrigal as Gigi

Recurring cast
Cindy Kurleto as Cassiopea
Bobby Andrews as Asval
Arthur Solinap as Muros
Benjie Paras as Wahid

Guest cast
Dawn Zulueta as Minea
Richard Gomez as Raquim
Al Tantay as Arvak
Ian Veneracion as Armeo
Allan Paule as Dado
Miguel Faustman as Bathala
Nicola Sermonia as young Pirena
Kristine Mangle as young Amihan
Abigael Arazo as young Alena
Julianne Gomez as young Danaya
Dominic Gacad as young Apitong
Phytos Ramirez as young Anthony
Irma Adlawan as Amanda
Jay Aquitania as Banjo
Brad Turvey as Axilom
Gerard Pizzaras as Bandok
Juliana Palermo as Lavanea
Diane Sison as Mayne
Romnick Sarmenta as Avilan 
Jake Cuenca as Kahlil
Eddie Gutierrez as Dakila 
Zoren Legaspi as Bagwis 
Jey Gumiran as Cleu
Antonio Aquitania as Alipato 
Sunshine Garcia as Agua 
Margaret Wilson as Aera
Cheska Garcia as Aure
Lloyd Barredo as Abog 
Vangie Labalan as Rosing 
Dino Guevarra as Carlos 
Juan Carlo Dizon as Chao
CJ Ramos as Bono

Ratings
According to AGB Nielsen Philippines' Mega Manila household television ratings, the pilot episode of Encantadia earned a 45.9% rating. The series had its highest rating with a 51.7% rating.

Accolades

Home media release
On March 4, 2008, GMA Records released the series on DVD. The 160 episodes are divided into 12 volumes of DVDs.

Reboot

Encantadia was rebooted in 2016 by GMA Entertainment TV. Marian Rivera played the role of Mine-a. While the four lead roles were portrayed by Kylie Padilla, Gabbi Garcia, Sanya Lopez and Glaiza de Castro.

References

External links
 
 

2005 Philippine television series debuts
2005 Philippine television series endings
Encantadia
Fantaserye and telefantasya
Filipino-language television shows
GMA Network drama series
Television shows set in the Philippines